The 1931 Western Carolina Yodelers football team represented Western Carolina Teachers College—now known as Western Carolina University—as an independent the 1931 college football season. Led by first-year head coach C. C. Poindexter, Western Carolina compiled a record of 4–4.

Schedule

References

Western Carolina
Western Carolina Catamounts football seasons
Western Carolina Yodelers football